United States gubernatorial elections were held in 1922, in 33 states, concurrent with the House and Senate elections, on November 7, 1922 (October 3 in Arkansas, and September 11 in Maine).

Results

See also 
1922 United States elections
1922 United States Senate elections
1922 United States House of Representatives elections

References

Notes 

 
November 1922 events